Bhai Ranjit Singh dhadrianwale (born 7 July 1983) Sikhism Preacher .

Gurudwara Parmeshar Dwar Sahib 

The building of Gurudwara Parmeshar Dwar Sahib, completed in 2010, is situated on the Sangrur-Patiala Road Sheikhupur, Punjab. The gurudwara complex also includes Kalgidhar Sangat Niwas and a massive diwan hall with the seating capacity of over 50000. Here, monthly Guru Manyo Granth Chetna Samagam  (holy congregation) is organized on First Saturday of every month. Sikh devotees (Sangat) gather in huge numbers and Amrit Sanchar is also held on same day. The programs are uploaded and broadcast live on TV, website, YouTube and a dedicated app.

Philosophy 
Dhadrianwale urges people to practice the teachings of Sikh Gurus in daily life, instead of just performing rituals. He urges common Sikh people to read and understand the Gurbani themselves. People must be honest, hardworking and should follow their responsibilities with passion. He teaches people to live a practical and truthful life. He refuses to believe in heaven or hell and claims that all our Karmas are paid-for at mental, emotional and spiritual levels in this life. He also opposes ritualistic animal slaughter practices that are prevalent in some sects. According to him, the faith in God is not limited to any deity, personality or holy place. He emphasizes that the whole universe is the embodiment of God (Ik Onkar) itself including the humans. He strongly criticizes exploitation of the environment, "We must take care of nature as it takes care of us" The law of nature is one thing he strongly believes in. Nature is bound by laws, and if we follow them, the desired results are bound to come.

In recent years, he shifted to a different perspective understanding the ideas in Guru Granth Sahib. There has been some ongoing controversy among some Sikh scholars and Sikh groups over this. In 2016, a conflict started with Baba Harnam Singh of Damdami Taksal. The basis of this was ideological disagreement. On the evening of 17 May 2016, while Ranjit Singh was travelling to attend a Diwan (congregation) in Ludhiana, more than two dozen armed men attacked him. His aide Bhai Bhupinder Singh Khasi Kalan was shot dead, but Ranjit Singh survived. Dhadrianwale continued to receive life threats from various groups. The chief minister of Punjab intervened and asked them to stop giving such threats.

In February 2020, activists from Sikh groups including Damdami Taksal disrupted his sermons alleging Dhadrianwale of distortion of Sikh history and opposition of core Sikh principles like Naam Japna (meditation with recitation of God's name); waking up at amrit vela (early morning) and belief in heaven and hell. Dhadrianwale preaches that these principles should be as per the judgement of an individual.

In March 2020 a group of protestors warned Dhadriawnale to face unpleasant response if he addresses any congregation in Punjab. Singh then decided not to hold gatherings to avoid any serious problem to sangat.

In August 2020, the Akal Takht directed the Sikh community to boycott Dhadrian Wale till he seeks clemency for his alleged objectionable remarks against 'Sikh principles', the Jathedar of Akal Takht and distortion of Sikh history. Dhadrian Wale was previously asked to participate in a meeting with a five-member committee constituted by Akal Takht Jathedar Harpreet Singh at Gurdwara Dukh Niwaran Sahib, Patiala in December 2019, but he declined the invitation.

References

External links 
 Gaana
 Official Android App
 Official iOS App
 Gurdwara ParmesharDwar Sahib &

1983 births
Living people
Sikh missionaries
Indian Sikhs
People from Sangrur district